Archduke Maximilian may refer to:
 Maximilian I, Holy Roman Emperor (1459–1519)
 Archduke Maximilian Ernest of Austria (1583–1616)
 Archduke Maximilian Francis of Austria (1756–1801)
 Emperor Maximilian I of Mexico (1832–1867)
 Archduke Maximilian of Austria-Este (1782–1863)
 Archduke Maximilian of Austria (1895–1952)